Diego Martín Scotti Ponce de León (born 14 January 1977 in Montevideo) is an Uruguayan retired footballer.

Scotti has had an extensive career in South America and China he has played for: Nacional, Montevideo Wanderers and Racing de Montevideo in Uruguay, Tianjin Teda F.C. in China, Olimpia in Paraguay, Audax Italiano in Chile.

He has also played in Argentina for Gimnasia y Esgrima de La Plata and Newell's Old Boys. His older brother Andrés Scotti currently plays in Uruguay for Nacional de Montevideo. He primarily played as a defensive midfielder but could also play as a centre back.

Club career
Scotti began his career at Nacional de Montevideo in 1998, winning the league title two years later. In January 2001, he was transferred to Gimnasia La Plata of Argentina. Scotti completed his move to Tianjin Teda for play in the Chinese Super League. After of his pass for China, he returned to Nacional in December 2003, once returning, now to Gimnasia. In 2005, he was transferred to Olimpia, remaining him until 2006, for shortly after signed for Montevideo Wanderers.

Audax and Newell's
In January 2007, Scotti joined Audax Italiano, signing a one-year contract. His Audax debut came on 28 January against Cobresal, playing the 90 minutes in a 2–1 victory. Scotti's first goals in the team was scored on a twice against Santiago Wanderers. He and his teammates achieved a very good football level under the coach Raul Toro, finishing thirds in positions table. In the next semester, he had many protagonism in the team, playing all matches, scoring goals and exhibing good skills.

His Audax performances, made that he was signed by Newell's Old Boys in January 2008, returning of this form to Argentina, after of play for Gimnasia y Esgrima de La Plata. However, he only played 14 games and in 2009, he was released of the club. Shortly after, Scotti signed for Racing de Montevideo. In 2010, he joined Córdoba of the Spanish Second Division before shortly after returning to his country to play in Miramar Misiones.

Unión Española
On 31 January 2010, Scotti's transfer to Unión Española of the Primera División was announced; he signed a one-year contract with the Chilean club for play the Copa Libertadores and the national league. He made his Unión debut as a 71st-minute substitution for Leandro Delgado, in the 1–0 win over Bolívar for the playoffs round of the Libertadores. He had a highlighted participation in the 2–1 loss against Colo-Colo for the national tournament, being one of Unión's best players in the game.

Montevideo Wanderers
On 5 July 2015, Montevideo Wanderers agreed to sign Diego Scotti

Honours

Club
 Unión Española
 Primera División de Chile (1): 2013 Transición
 Supercopa de Chile (1): 2013

References

External links
  
 Diego Scotti – Argentine Primera statistics at Fútbol XXI 
 Diego Scotti at BDFA.com.ar 
 
 Scotti joins Córdoba C.F. 

1977 births
Living people
Footballers from Montevideo
Uruguayan footballers
Uruguayan expatriate footballers
Association football midfielders
Tianjin Jinmen Tiger F.C. players
Club Nacional de Football players
Racing Club de Montevideo players
Montevideo Wanderers F.C. players
Club de Gimnasia y Esgrima La Plata footballers
Newell's Old Boys footballers
Unión Española footballers
Audax Italiano footballers
Córdoba CF players
Club Olimpia footballers
Boston River players
Uruguayan Primera División players
Chilean Primera División players
Argentine Primera División players
Expatriate footballers in Argentina
Expatriate footballers in Chile
Expatriate footballers in Paraguay
Uruguayan expatriate sportspeople in Paraguay
Uruguayan expatriate sportspeople in Chile
Uruguayan expatriate sportspeople in Argentina
Uruguayan sportspeople of Italian descent